Elle Dawe (born 16 February 1981) is an Australian film and television actress, comedian and model.

Acting
Elle Dawe studied acting while attending Newtown High School of the Performing Arts in her younger years.

Her first major role on Australian television was in the 2008 SBS series Swift and Shift Couriers, portraying Elle Whick. Following this, she portrayed the popular character Shazza Jones, in Housos (SBS/7mate), Fat Pizza: Back In Business (7mate), Bogan Hunters (7mate) and in the feature films Housos vs. Authority (2012) and Fat Pizza vs. Housos (2014). She has hosted The Circle on Ten and has been featured on Seven's Sunrise and The Morning Show.

Dawe has also appeared in television commercials for Franklins and Tourism New Zealand.

Other
Dawe has performed stand up comedy at the Adelaide Fringe Festival and the Sydney Comedy Festival, and has appeared on the cover and in a pictorial of the 7 November 2011 edition of Zoo Weekly Australia. She subsequently appeared in a second pictorial for the 28 January 2013 special "Australia Day" edition of the magazine.

Charity work
Dawe lends a lot of time to the support of various charities such as The Starlight Children's Foundation, Rotary Hat Day and most recently Art for the Reef.

Filmography

Film

Television

Video games

See also

Swift and Shift Couriers
Housos
Bogan Hunters
Housos vs. Authority
Fat Pizza vs. Housos

References

External links

1981 births
Living people
21st-century Australian actresses
Australian film actresses
Australian stand-up comedians
Australian television actresses
Actresses from Sydney